Jaan Tätte (born 24 March 1964 in Viljandi) is an Estonian playwright, poet, actor, and singer.

Biography
From 1982 to 1984 Tätte studied biology at the University of Tartu. From 1985 to 1986 he attended a graduate program at the Tallinn Pedagogical Institute (now Tallinn University) and studied acting in the drama department of the Tallinn Conservatory (now, the Estonian Academy of Music and Theatre), graduating in 1990. Since 1990 he has been an ensemble member of the Tallinn City Theatre. Since 2003 he has worked as a playwright at the same theater. He has also been involved in films.

Towards the end of the 1990s, he began to write plays that would make him well-known beyond the borders of Estonia. His first piece "Ristumine peateega" (Bungee Jumping) was a great success. In 2000 "Sild" (The Bridge), followed in 2001. In 2005, he wrote "Palju õnne argipäevaks!"(Fasten Seat Belts or Good Luck to Everyday Life) and "Meeletu". "Kaev" was premiered in June 2006 in Tallinn.

Since 2004 he has also appeared as a singer with Marko Matvere; they have released two CDs together. He is married and has two children.

Filmography

 Ainult hulludele ehk halastajaõde (1990)
 Firewater  (Estonian: Tulivesi; 1994) 
 The Shoe (Latvian: Kurpe, German: Der Schuh; 1998) 
 The Highway Crossing (Estonian: Ristumine peateega; 1999)
 Names in Marble (Estonian: Nimed marmortahvlil; 2002)

Awards
1996 Scholarship from Estonian Cultural Capital
1997 Second prize of the comedy competition of the Estonian Theater Agency
1997 Cultural prize "Big Car" for the best lyrics
1999 Cultural Prize "Big Car" for the best drama
2001 Second prize of the comedy competition of the Estonian Theater Agency
2002 Annual prize of the Estonian Theater Agency
2002 Literature Prize of the Baltic Assembly
2004 Order of the White Star V. Class
2010 Annual prize of Estonian music

References

1964 births
Living people
Estonian dramatists and playwrights
Estonian male stage actors
Estonian male film actors
Estonian male television actors
21st-century Estonian male singers
Estonian rock singers
Estonian male poets
Estonian songwriters
People from Viljandi
University of Tartu alumni
Tallinn University alumni
Estonian Academy of Music and Theatre alumni
Recipients of the Order of the White Star, 5th Class
20th-century Estonian male actors
21st-century Estonian male actors
21st-century Estonian poets